W18, W-18 or W.18 may refer to :
 W18 engine, a type of engine
 Hansa-Brandenburg W.18, a Hansa-Brandenburg aircraft
 1-(4-Nitrophenylethyl)piperidylidene-2-(4-chlorophenyl)sulfonamide (W-18), a designer drug once thought to be a potent opioid.
 W18 Suburban Airport, Laurel Maryland. 
 Materials Disclosure Process,  Motorola specification and procedure to sets forth disclosure of materials use for manufacture and delivery of products